KL1, or Kernel Language 1 is an experimental AND-parallel version of KL0 developed for the ICOT Fifth Generation Computer project. KL1 is an implementation of Flat GHC (a subset of the Guarded Horn Clauses language by Kazunori Ueda), making it a parallelised Prolog variant.

References

External links
 The KLIC Association, home of the KLIC KL1 to C compiler - last update circa 1999. (The klic.org domain expired and was replaced by a gift company some time between 2010 and 2012; the above link has been adjusted to point to the most recent copy at the Internet Archive.)

Further reading
"Design of the Kernel Language for the Parallel Inference Machine", U. Kazunori et al., Computer J (December 1990). 

Prolog programming language family
Japanese inventions